Joan II, Countess of Dreux (1309–1355), was ruling Countess regnant of Dreux 1346–1355.

Life

She was the only child of John II of Dreux by his second wife, Perrenelle de Sully.

She married in 1330 Louis I, Viscount of Thouars (d. 1370), and with him had:
 Simon, (d. 1365), her successor, who married Jeanne "the damsel of Dreux" (1353–1420)), daughter of John of Artois, Count of Eu
 Péronelle (d. 1397), co-countess of Dreux with her sisters, who married firstly in 1345 Amaury de Craon (d. 1373), then secondly, after 1376, Clement Rouault (d. 1397)
 Isabeau (d. 1397), co-countess of Dreux with her sisters, married firstly Guy de Nesles (d. 1352); secondly, in 1356, Ingelger d'Amboise; and thirdly Guillaume d'Harcourt (d. 1400)
 Marguerite (d. 1397), co-countess of Dreux with her sisters, married firstly Thomas de Chemille, and then secondly Guy Turpin, lord de Crisse

References

Counts of Dreux
1293 births
1329 deaths
House of Dreux
14th-century women rulers